The 2009 Challenge Trophy was be contested for in Saskatoon, Saskatchewan from October 7 to 12, 2009.  The round robin group seedings were based on last years performance.
Group A : Alberta, British Columbia, Ontario, Manitoba, Saskatchewan
Group B : Quebec, Prince Edward Island, Nova Scotia, Newfoundland Labrador, Yukon

Day 2 saw extreme snow and wind which forced organizers to adjust the schedule to the SaskTel Indoor pitch.  Games were also shortened to 60 minutes.

Teams and rosters
The Nationals are seeded based on last seasons performance.  For 2009 the seedings are: 
AB -  Calgary Callies
QC -  Royal-Sélect de Beauport
PE -  Avondale Islanders
BC -  West Van SC
ON -  Real Toronto
NS -  Halifax City SC
NL -  Holy Cross Crusaders
MB -  Hellas SC
SK -  Huskie Alumni
YT -  Yukon Selects

Hellas SC

Royal-Sélect de Beauport

Calgary Callies

Results

Group stage

Finals

Final standings

Qualified teams

British Columbia
The BC Provincial Cup is held in the spring of the season.  This year's event went from April 4 to May 16.

Alberta
The Mike Traficante Challenge Cup will be held in Edmonton from 4 Sep to 7 Sep, 2009.info  The teams will be seeded from the Alberta Major Soccer League.  The groups will be S1, N2 and N3 in one and N1, S2 and S3 in the other.  Seeds S3 and N3 are open to challenge from any district.  This year, the teams in the AMSL include:

North:
Edmonton Green & Gold
Edmonton Drillers
Edmonton Scottish
Edmonton KC Trojans
Edmonton Victoria
South:
Calgary Callies
Calgary Dinos
Calgary Villains Elite
Calgary PARS
Lethbridge FC

AMSL Site

Saskatchewan
The Saskatchewan representative shall be determined through the Saskatchewan Premier Soccer League.  Six teams will compete this season including:
Yorkton United
ACFC Milan
SK Canada Games
Huskie Alumni
Saskatoon Hose and Hydrant
Colo Colo
Standings as of 9 July 2009

The Saskatchewan Huskie Alumni have qualified

Manitoba
The Manitoba representative will be determined through the MSA 2009 Senior Provincial Championship.  This cup competition will take place in August as the team entry's are due 4 August 2009.  Watch for teams in the Manitoba Major Soccer League to be entered.  Seeding is determined by 15 July 2009.

Hellas SC of Manitoba qualified after a 1-0 extra time win over Lucania.

Ontario
The Ontario representative is determined by the Ontario Cup.  This is a single knock-out tournament with the finals scheduled for 20-Sep-2009 at 8:00pm at the Soccer Centre in Vaughan.  This year's event features 62 teams entering the bracket at various levels determined by geography.  Before the First round is a Preliminary round and an Extra Preliminary round for some regions.

The final match saw a repeat of 2008 between London AEK and Real Toronto.

Ontario Cup proper

Québec
The AAA Quebec Cup (aka Coupe du Québec Saputo AAA) is the cup competition that determines the Quebec representative at the Canadian Club Nationals.  The first 2 rounds are home and away matches, while the last 3 rounds are single matches. Results Site

New Brunswick
Did not send a team in 2008 and so are unranked for 2009.  Deadline for teams to register is 15-July-2009.

Prince Edward Island
The Avondale Islanders seen to be the only team competing at a high enough level and will probably represent PEI again.

Nova Scotia
The winner of the Nova Scotia Soccer League will represent the province at the National Challenge Trophy.  This year's competition will include:
Dartmouth United
Cape Breton United
Halifax City S.C.
Halifax County United Molson Canadian
Halifax Dunbrack Bremner's
NS Canada Games
Scotia
Valley Kings Arms
standings as of 22-July-2009

Newfoundland Labrador
2009 Newfoundland and Labrador Challenge Cup

Yukon
Selects Team

References

External links
 

2009
Canadian Challenge Trophy
Nat
Sports competitions in Saskatoon
Canadian Challenge Trophy